= Courtside College Basketball =

1984 video game

- Developer: Lance Haffner Games
- Publisher: Lance Haffner Games
- Platform: Commodore 64
- Release: WW: 1984
- Genre: Sports video game
- Modes: Single player, multiplayer

Courtside College Basketball is a 1984 video game by Haffner.

== Gameplay ==
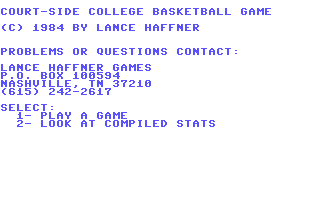
Title screen

Courtside College Basketball is a text-based sports simulation of statistics.

== Reception ==
In 1996, Computer Gaming World declared Courtside College Basketball the 149th-best computer game ever released.
